Rock Creek Township is one of twelve townships in Bartholomew County, Indiana, United States. As of the 2010 census, its population was 1,424 and it contained 566 housing units.

Geography

Unincorporated towns
 Burnsville
 Grammer

Extinct towns
 Plumsock

Adjacent townships
 Clifty Township (north)
 Jackson Township, Decatur County (east)
 Geneva Township, Jennings County (south)
 Sand Creek Township (southwest)
 Columbus Township (west)
 Clay Township (northwest)

Cemeteries
The township contains the following cemeteries: Donaldson, Parkison (Bannister), Burnsville Christian, Carson (private), and a portion of Little Sandcreek Baptist. Two cemeteries have vanished: Morgan and Strickland.

Major highways
  Indiana State Road 7
  Indiana State Road 9

School districts
 Bartholomew County School Corporation

Political districts
 Indiana's 9th congressional district
 State House District 57
 State Senate District 41

Politics
Rock Creek Township has been cited by some in Indiana politics as being a barometer to the rest of the state's political disposition during elections. This is in large part due to the even distribution of both Republicans and Democrats in the township. In addition to Indiana, some stories have surfaced that tell of national news agencies checking on the township vote totals during the early and middle half of the 20th century for the same reasons.

References

Citations

Sources
 United States Census Bureau 2007 TIGER/Line Shapefiles
 United States Board on Geographic Names (GNIS)
 United States National Atlas

External links

 Indiana Township Association
 United Township Association of Indiana

Townships in Bartholomew County, Indiana
Townships in Indiana